Jin Shouhao or Kim Suho()  is an ethnic Korean Chinese politician. He was previously the governor of Yanbian Korean Autonomous Prefecture beginning in 2017, and voluntarily resigned in 2021, being succeeded by Hong Qing. As of 2020 he is also the serving mayor of Yanji.

He was born in June 1962. In 2018 he was elected as a delegate for the province of Jilin for the 13th National People's Congress.

References 

Living people
1962 births
Yanji
Chinese people of Korean descent
Governors of Yanbian Korean Autonomous Prefecture
Delegates to the 13th National People's Congress
Mayors of places in China